Vyacheslav Leshchenko (born April 24, 1995) is a Russian professional ice hockey right winger. He is currently playing with HC Neftekhimik Nizhnekamsk of the Kontinental Hockey League (KHL).

Playing career
Leshchenko made his Kontinental Hockey League debut playing with Atlant Moscow Oblast during the 2013–14 KHL season.

During the 2020–21 season, Leshchenko began the campaign with Chelmet Chelyabinsk of the VHL, while under contract to Traktor Chelyabinsk. After registering 1 goal in 3 games he was released from his contract with Traktor and on 22 November 2020, Leshchenko continued in the KHL, agreeing to a contract for the remainder of the season with HC Kunlun Red Star. He produced 8 goals and 14 points through 33 regular season games in his tenure with Kunlun.

As a free agent, Leshchenko returned to Russia in agreeing to a one-year deal with HC Vityaz on 15 June 2021. In the 2021–22 season, Leshchenko registered 4 goals and 7 points through 20 games before he transferred to HC Neftekhimik Nizhnekamsk on 16 December 2021.

References

External links

1995 births
Living people
Ak Bars Kazan players
Atlant Moscow Oblast players
Chelmet Chelyabinsk players
HC Kunlun Red Star players
HC Neftekhimik Nizhnekamsk players
Russian ice hockey right wingers
People from Elektrostal
HC Sochi players
HC Spartak Moscow players
HC Vityaz players
Sportspeople from Moscow Oblast